Cheick Aymar Timité (born 20 November 1997) is an Ivorian professional footballer who plays as a forward.

Club career
Timité began playing football at the age of 15 with ES Nanterre before moving to Ajaccio's youth academy. He debuted with Ajaccio in a 0–0 Ligue 2 tie with Auxerre on 19 February 2016. Timité joined Amiens in 2016. Due to legal issues regarding his transfer, he could not play for Amiens in his first year and was loaned to USL Dunkerque for the 2017–18 season.

On 31 August 2021, Timité moved to Spain and joined Segunda División side CF Fuenlabrada on a one-year deal. The following 31 January, after just one start in seven matches overall, he terminated his contract. On the same day, Timité signed with Valenciennes until the end of the season.

International career
Timité debuted for the Ivory Coast U23s in a pair of 2019 Africa U-23 Cup of Nations qualification matches in March 2019.

Honours
Ivory Coast U23
Africa U-23 Cup of Nations: runner-up 2019

References

External links

Eurosport Profile

1997 births
Living people
Footballers from Abidjan
Ivorian footballers
Association football midfielders
Ivory Coast under-20 international footballers
Footballers at the 2020 Summer Olympics
Olympic footballers of Ivory Coast
Ligue 1 players
Ligue 2 players
Championnat National players
Championnat National 3 players
Segunda División players
Amiens SC players
USL Dunkerque players
AC Ajaccio players
Paris FC players
CF Fuenlabrada footballers
Valenciennes FC players
Ivorian expatriate footballers
Ivorian expatriate sportspeople in France
Expatriate footballers in France
Ivorian expatriate sportspeople in Spain
Expatriate footballers in Spain